Horace Aylwin (1 October 1902 – 25 July 1980) was a Canadian sprinter. He competed in the men's 400 metres at the 1924 Summer Olympics.

References

External links
 

1902 births
1980 deaths
Athletes (track and field) at the 1924 Summer Olympics
Canadian male sprinters
Olympic track and field athletes of Canada
People from Carman, Manitoba